Qashan was a medieval city in Volga Bulgaria, on the right bank of Kama river from the 12th to the 15th century.

In the 12th and 13th centuries it was one of the administrative and political centres of the Lower Kama region of Volga Bulgaria.

In the 14th century it became a capital of the Qashan Duchy. In 1391 it was destroyed by ushkuiniks, Russian river pirates, and finally in 1399 by Muscovy troops.

Ruins are situated near the present village of Shuran in the Laishevsky District of Tatarstan.

See also

Keşan

References
 

History of Tatarstan
Golden Horde
Volga Bulgaria
Defunct towns in Russia
Archaeological sites in Tatarstan
Former populated places in Russia
Cultural heritage monuments of federal significance in Tatarstan